Paper Soldiers is a 2002 American urban crime comedy film. This hip-hop comedy from Roc-A-Fella's film division stars Kevin Hart (in his film debut), Beanie Sigel, and Stacey Dash. Rapper Jay-Z appears in a cameo role. Hart plays the character Shawn, a rookie thief, who is part of a crew of thieves, doing small-time jobs like house breaking.

The crew itself is not exactly a highly polished operation, and the crew's capers result in comic mishaps far more often than actual thefts. They still manage to do some jobs like breaking into Jay-Z's house and robbing some of its material goods, but predictably, they receive prison time for robbery or aggravated assault.

Beanie Sigel plays Stu, a hot-headed hood bully who does small robberies to make some cash, while Damon Dash and Memphis Bleek act as thieves of another crew, and Stacey Dash is a beautiful woman named Tamika. Jay-Z appears as himself. Released on June 7, 2002, it was produced by Roc-A-Fella and distributed by Universal Pictures.



Plot 
Shawn attends his mother's funeral with his girlfriend Monique and their son, and among others, his friends Burtie and Johnny. Burtie tries to convince Shawn to do some theft jobs, which Shawn declines at first. One day, Shawn goes to see his parole officer and she informs him that his next urine test needs to be clean and that he must keep his job at the beeper shop. Shawn arrives to work and receives his check, becoming upset at how low his payment is. After seeing the electricity at his house get cut off, he decides to accept Burtie's offer. Their first heist is a failure but they do another job the following day, this time accompanied by Johnny. Shawn is happy, as he is receiving more money with burglaries than he gets at his job.

Shawn and his friend Stu, just released from jail, decide to rob a house and discover it belongs to a famous boxer. A neighbor spots them breaking in, and they flee. Nearby detectives Johnson and Travis receive the report and a car chase ensues as the detectives chase Shawn and Stu. Shawn escapes, but Stu is arrested.

With Burtie in jail, Shawn visits Burtie's brother Will and asks to join his crew. Will accepts and trains him. On Shawn's next burglary job, he is chastised by Will and his partner Larry (who doesn't like Shawn), for using a crowbar to break into a home. Will cuts the wire of the alarm and they are able to steal the jewelry. The next day, they break into another home.

Will sees a wire is cut and they notice the back door is open. When they walk in, they find thieves (Damon Dash and Memphis Bleek) robbing the home. Much to Shawn's surprise, the two are already familiar with Will and Larry, and they agree to find what they can there and split the earnings. Shawn and Johnny later rob Jay-Z's home.

Shawn then takes Monique out to celebrate his birthday at a club, along with Will, Larry and Johnny. Shawn goes to the bar and gets alcohol. As Shawn returns to his table, he sees Stu in the club. Stu then notices Pat, the mom of his kids, out with a man named Rudy. Stu confronts them and then attacks Rudy. After this, Rudy tries to leave with Pat to her home but she rejects him. He then assaults her. Pat calls Stu and Stu gets Shawn to go with him as he beats up Rudy. The next day, Shawn, Stu and Johnny break into another home, but leave early due to cops driving around the neighborhood.

Shawn goes to see his parole officer for the second time. She informs him that he failed the urine test, then warns him that if he fails the test again, he will go to jail. Shawn arrives to work and gets fired. Shawn's co-worker Kay then asks if he could join in on the burglaries, which Shawn accepts, bringing Kay along as a driver and lookout. Moments after Shawn and Johnny enter a home, Kay gets paranoid and leaves. As Shawn and Johnny exit the home, they see Kay has left. Kay comes back and bypasses them, then circles around in the car as Johnny stops Kay. They are then chased by cops. Shawn and Johnny escape, but Kay is caught.

As soon as Shawn gets home, he gets into an argument with Monique over his acts of crime. The next day, Shawn sees his parole officer again. She informs him that he once again failed the urine test. As she calls to get a cop, Shawn flees. He then meets Will and Larry at an auto body shop. They talk business with shop employee Mikey O, and he informs them about a home with lots of money.

Mikey O sends his friend Mike E. to go with them. Detectives Johnson and Travis track them down. Mike E. and Larry are caught, but Shawn and Will escape. As Shawn goes home to say goodbye to Monique and their son, he sees the house is empty.

The cops catch up to Shawn. He tries to escape but gets caught hiding in a dog house. He receives a 12-year prison sentence, but serves less on good behavior. The film ends as it began, with Shawn playing dominoes with Burtie and Johnny, as he delivers a message to the audience to not break into other people's homes.

Cast

Reception 
Nathan Rabin gave the film a mixed review in The Dissolve, claiming the film was an example of "rapsploitation" and that plot was "wobbly", while also crediting the film for being able to bring "its world context and color".

See also 
 List of hood films

References

External links 

2002 films
2000s hip hop films
Hood comedy films
American independent films
American crime comedy films
Universal Pictures direct-to-video films
2000s crime comedy films
2002 directorial debut films
2002 comedy films
Films directed by Damon Dash
2000s English-language films
2000s American films